Ephialtias tenuifascia is a moth of the  family Notodontidae. It is found in Guyana and has also been recorded from Trinidad.

External links
Species page at Tree of Life project

Notodontidae of South America
Moths described in 1918